Pony is the third studio album and major-label debut by English musician Rex Orange County. It was released on 25 October 2019.

Critical reception

Hannah Mylrea from NME wrote of the album: "A dazzling follow up to Apricot Princess, Rex Orange County’s third studio album is a total delight. It may be miserable outside, and the world's going to shit, but try listening to Pony and not feeling a little bit more optimistic about the future. Go on, we dare you." Elly Watson expressed similar views in DIY magazine, describing it as "equal parts heart wrenching and hopeful".

Giving the album an average 3 out of 5, Tara Joshi at The Guardian described the album as "jaunty and engaging", though Joshi expressed that "Pony meanders, seemingly unaware of its purpose".

Luke Levenson from American Songwriter commented: "His unique pop prosody and production skills, more sophisticated than ever in Pony, foretell that his sound will continue progressing to new creative heights, with the heft of catchy pop music and the inventiveness of its growing indie subgenre."

Track listing

Personnel
Credits for Pony adapted from AllMusic.
Rex Orange County – vocals, guitar, bass, drum programming, drums, Fender Rhodes, keyboards, organ, percussion, piano, producer, saxophone, strings, synthesizer, vocoder, woodwind
Ben Baptie – guitar, drum programming, brass, saxophone, woodwind, strings, percussion, production, mixing
Sally Herbert – arrangement, conducting, strings, violin
Pino Palladino – bass
Michael Underwood – clarinet, flute, saxophone, woodwind arrangement
Nick Barr – viola
Natalia Bonner – violin
Seb Brooks - viola
Ian Burdge – cello
Reiad Chibah – viola
Calina de la Mare – violin
Louisa Fuller – violin
Richard George – violin
Ian Humphries – violin
Oli Langford – violin
John Metcalfe – viola
Steve Morris – violin
Tom Pigott-Smith – violin
Rachel Robson – viola
Tony Wollard – cello
Chris Worsey – cello
Amy Stewart – string conductor
Haydn Bendall – string engineer
Johnny Woodham – trumpet
Choir: Karima Abdi, Ayana Ahmed, Abdul Akbari, Zainab Al-Shammary, Mahad Ali, Retaj Almataj, Ghena Alshteiwi, Emily Amoura, Junaid Attoh, Vihan Bhudia, Nelu Dobie, Adelina Gherman, Luke Halpin, Mosda Hisharizada, Sarah Jabir, Isa Khalid, Salam Al Lakod, Lisa Marie Massiah, José Mendes, Vanessa Prilogran, Gabi Sandru, Farah Siddique, Houda Warsama, Mohammad Zalghara
Thea Morgan-Murrell – backing vocals 

Production
Bráulio Amado – design, illustrations
Madeleine Pfull – paintings
Tom Archer – assistant
Natasha Canter – assistant
Alex Ferguson – assistant
Ted Jensen – mastering

Charts

Weekly charts

Year-end charts

Certifications

References

2019 albums
Rex Orange County albums